Kathleen Alice Kenealy is an American attorney and politician who served 21 days as Acting Attorney General of California in 2017. She took office after Kamala Harris resigned to take her seat in the United States Senate. Kenealy was succeeded by Xavier Becerra, after the California State Legislature confirmed his appointment as the state's new attorney general. She attended George Mason University for her bachelor's degree and the Columbus School of Law at Catholic University of America for her Juris Doctor.

References

Year of birth missing (living people)
Living people
California Attorneys General
California Democrats
Catholic University of America alumni
George Mason University alumni